Bromyard Town Football Club is a football club based in Bromyard, Herefordshire, England.

History
The club was established in 1893. They were founder members of the Herefordshire League and were champions in 1946–47 and 1947–48. In 1995 the club moved up to Division One of the West Midlands (Regional) League. Following league reorganisation, they were placed in Division One South for the 1996–97 season, and in 1999–2000 they were Division One South champions, earning promotion to the Premier Division.

Bromyard were relegated back to Division One after finishing bottom of the Premier Division in 2014–15, but won Division One the following season to secure an immediate return to the Premier Division. However, they were relegated again at the end of the 2015–16 season, having finished second-from-bottom of the Premier Division.

Ground
After playing at Broadbridge, the club purchased land at Delahay Meadow in 1986 to build a new ground, which was officially opened in 1994. Floodlights were installed in 1999.

Honours
West Midlands (Regional) League
Division One champions 2014–15
Division One South champions 1999–2000
Herefordshire League
Champions 1946–47, 1947–48

Records
Best FA Cup performance: Preliminary round, 2007–08, 2009–10
Best FA Vase performance: Second round, 2001–02

See also
Bromyard Town F.C. players

References

External links

Football clubs in England
Football clubs in Herefordshire
Association football clubs established in 1893
1893 establishments in England
Herefordshire Football League
West Midlands (Regional) League